Alfred P. C. Petsch (1887–1981) was a Democratic member of the Texas House of Representatives for the 85th District of Fredericksburg and Gillespie County.  He was a retired lieutenant colonel who saw service in both World War I and World War II.  Petsch was also an educator, a lawyer, a civic leader and a philanthropist.

Early years

Alfred Petsch was born on August 16, 1887, in Luckenbach, Texas, to Joe F. and Ida (Baag) Petsch.  As was the custom among Germans of the Texas Hill Country of that era, Petsch grew up speaking only German, and did not learn English until he attended college outside the community.

Education and early career

Petsch graduated in 1906 from Southwest Texas State Normal School in San Marcos. Petsch worked as a school teacher to fund his education. From 1906–1907, and the fall semester of 1908, Petsch attended the University of Texas, graduating from University of Texas School of Law in 1910 and passing the State Bar of Texas exam that same year. In 1934, Petsch was licensed to practice before the United States Supreme Court.

Petsch opened his first law office in Fredericksburg on January 1, 1911.

Military service

Petsch was commissioned a second lieutenant during World War I on May 26, 1917. He served at Camp Funston, at Camp Travis (later absorbed by Fort Sam Houston), and at Camp Grant in Rockford, Illinois, where he was discharged on December 3, 1918, with the rank of major of infantry. In 1919 he received an appointment as major in the Infantry Reserve. During World War II,  Lieutenant Colonel Petsch served at Camp Bullis (1942–43), the Hereford Internment Camp (1943), and Camp Joseph T. Robinson, North Little Rock, Arkansas (1943–45).

Legislative career

Petsch was appointed Gillespie County Attorney, March 1911.

He was a Democrat, 85th District, Fredericksburg, Gillespie County, elected in 1924 to the Texas House of Representatives, succeeding Samuel Ealy Johnson, Jr. He was reelected in subsequent terms until 1933. Petch was again elected in 1935, serving until 1941.

Committee assignments for Representative Alfred P.C. Petsch
Source: Legislative Reference Library of Texas

Newspaper

In 1915, the Fredericksburg Standard was purchased by the Fredericksburg Publishing Company, which also published the German language newspaper Fredericksburg Wochenblatt. Petsch was a founding member and director of the publishing company, as well as a contributor of a weekly newspaper column titled We Believe.

Civic participation

As a member of the Fredericksburg Progressive Business League, he worked in 1913 to bring a railroad to Fredericksburg. Petsch served on the Fredericksburg school board, and was president of the Fredericksburg Chamber of Commerce 1923–24.  He helped reorganize the Gillespie County Fair Association in 1922. Petsch was one of the organizers of the Hill Country Bar Association.

After Citizens Bank and Bank of Fredericksburg closed their doors in 1932 during the Great Depression, a committee was formed to organize a new bank to serve the needs of the community.  Petch served on the organizing committee, along with H.H. Sagebiel, E.H. Riley, H.A. Ries, W.H. Schaefer, Eric Juenke, Edward Stein, W.J. Schroeder, John W. Metzger, and M.L. Bogisch. The new bank opened its doors as Fredericksburg National Bank on April 6, 1932. Petsch served on the board of directors from its founding, as chairman of the board from 1969 to 1979, and as the bank's attorney.

Petsch, a friend of Lyndon Johnson and his wife Lady Bird Johnson, was a major financial contributor to Lady Bird Johnson Park.
He helped to organize the Hill Country Memorial Hospital and served on its board of directors during planning and construction.
He was also a contributing force to the development of the Fleet Admiral Chester W. Nimitz Naval Museum.

Colonel and Mrs. Petsch were influential members of many local civic organizations, such as
the non-profit Hill Country Student Help scholarship entity, the Community Chest, and the local 4-H youth organization.  They were made honorary lifetime members of the Parent-Teacher Association in 1968. On September 28, 1969, Fredericksburg celebrated Alfred and Myra Petsch Day. The Alfred and Myra Petsch Appreciation Dinner, which drew 500 people at $2.50 a ticket, was held at the Fair Park Exhibition Hall. President and Mrs. Lyndon B. Johnson shared the head table with the Petsches.

Personal life and death

Alfred Petsch married Myra Slator on May 3, 1918, at St. Mark's Episcopal Church in San Antonio. The couple had two children.

He retired from his law practice in 1980 and died on November 28, 1981, in Fredericksburg. He was buried in Greenwood Cemetery.

Memberships

Order of the Eastern Star
Alfazar Temple of the Mystic Shrine, San Antonio (founding member)
The Imperial Shrine
Rotary Club
Masonic Lodge

References

External links
Alfred P.C. Petsch - Texas Legislature

1887 births
1981 deaths
German-American culture in Texas
American people of German descent
People from Gillespie County, Texas
Members of the Texas House of Representatives
People from Fredericksburg, Texas
20th-century American politicians